A partial list of housing cooperatives in New York City.

Projects originally built as housing cooperatives 
 Alku and Alku Toinen, started in 1916 by Finnish immigrants
 Hudson View Gardens (1923–25), Hudson Heights, real estate developer Charles Paterno, architect George Fred Pelham, Jr.
 United Workers Cooperative Colony (1927–1929), 339 + 385 units, on Allerton Avenue on the Bronx, sponsored by communist garment industry workers; known as "The Communist Coops"
 Dunbar Apartments, built by John D. Rockefeller, Jr. in 1928 as a housing cooperative to provide housing for African Americans. Bankrupt in 1936 and taken over by Rockefeller.

Sponsored by Amalgamated Clothing Workers of America, Architects Springsteen and Goldhammer, Herman Jessor
 Amalgamated Housing Cooperative (1927, 1947–49, expansion 1952–55, 1968–70 Bronx, "The Amalgamated", 1,435 units; still operating as a co-operative
 Amalgamated Dwellings (1930), in Cooperative Village, Lower East Side of Manhattan, New York City, 236 units
 Hillman Housing Corporation (1947–1950), in Cooperative Village, 807 units

Sponsored by the United Housing Foundation and International Ladies' Garment Workers' Union. Architects George W. Springsteen and Herman Jessor

 East River Houses, (1956), in Cooperative Village, 1,672 units,
 Seward Park Housing Corporation, in Cooperative Village, 1,728 units
 Mutual Houses and Park Reservoir Housing Corporation (1955), Bronx affiliated with Amalgamated Housing
 Penn South (1962), 2,820 units, Chelsea, Manhattan
 Rochdale Village (1965), 5,860 units, central Queens
 Amalgamated Warbasse Houses (1965), 2,585 units, Coney Island, Brooklyn
 Amalgamated Towers (1969), 316 units (see "Amalgamated Housing Cooperative" above)
 Co-op City (1968–1971), Baychester area of the Bronx 15,382 units
 Twin Pines Village (Starrett City) (1975), 5,881 units, southern Brooklyn

Mitchell-Lama Housing Program
 Morningside Gardens (1957), Morningside Heights
 Southbridge Towers (1969), Lower Manhattan
 Confucius Plaza (1975), Chinatown, Manhattan

Converted rental property 
 Castle Village (1939, 1985), real estate developer Charles Paterno, architect George Fred Pelham, Jr.

See also
 List of condominiums in the United States

References 
 Labor and housing in New York City
 2004 Annual Report – Mitchell-Lama Housing Companies in New York State
 DHCR-Supervised Developments Within New York City
 DHCR-Supervised Developments Outside New York City

cooperatives
cooperatives